Bazhou, formerly Ba County, is a county-level city in Hebei province, China. It is under the jurisdiction of Langfang prefecture-level city. As of 2002, it had a population of over 132,000.

Administrative divisions
Towns:
Bazhou Town, Nanmeng, Xin'an, Tang'erli, Jianchapu, Shengfang, Yangfengang

Townships:
Chaheji Township, Kangxianzhuang Township, Dongyangzhuang Township, Wangzhuangzi Township, Dongduan Township

Climate

Transportation
There are three railway stations in Bazhou. Bazhou railway station is the oldest and is an intermediate stop on the Beijing–Kowloon railway and the western terminus of the Tianjin–Bazhou railway. Bazhou West railway station is an intermediate stop on the Tianjin–Baoding intercity railway. Bazhou North railway station is an intermediate stop on the Beijing–Xiong'an intercity railway.

References

External links

 
County-level cities in Hebei
Langfang